This is a list of characters for the manga and anime series Mob Psycho 100.

Main characters
 / 

Played by: Tatsuomi Hamada
Mob is an eighth grade Esper with powerful psychic abilities. His bowl-cut hairstyle is his defining physical feature. He is not good at reading the atmosphere, and since childhood, has rarely felt or displayed intense emotion, typically having a dull expression on his face. He thinks his power is unnecessary in his life, so he avoids using it. He suppresses his emotions to keep his power in control, but when the percentage of his accumulated feelings reaches 100, he is overcome by the strongest emotion he currently feeling and unleashes the full extent of his powers. He works at Reigen's spirit counsel for 300 yen an hour. After being begged to join the Telepathy Club to prevent their dissolution, he instead chose to join the Body Improvement Club hoping not only to impress his secret love, Tsubomi, but also to improve himself as a person. He is credited as Salt Middle School's  known as White T Poison, but this remains unknown to many including himself. Mob also possesses an unknown power which far surpasses even the height of his abilities, but is uncontrollable and only awakens when unconscious, and is called ???%.

Played by: Kazuki Namioka
A self-proclaimed spirit medium and Mob's mentor, Reigen runs a low-cost psychic consultation business called "Spirits and Such". He lacks actual psychic abilities and is essentially a con artist, using his intelligence and charisma to solve his clients' problems with skills he calls "secret techniques". Though he tends to put his own self-interest first, Reigen seems to genuinely care for Mob, and has made him promise never to use his powers against other people. After temporarily acquiring Mob's psychic powers during the battle against Claw's 7th Division, which he used to convince most of the surviving higher-ups to turn over a new leaf and return to society, he has retained the ability to see very low-level spirits. His backstory is revealed later in the story, and he remembers his time when he worked at a company, but then quit his job there because he was bored and he decided to rent an office. He only started his psychic business after looking at a magazine, and he was actually going to quit it, until he met Mob for the first time and became his master.

A deceptive upper-class evil spirit with red circles on his cheeks who can unleash the full potential of whatever body he possesses. However, he is unable to possess powerful psychics without permission, and cannot take full control of the psychic's body. He has also shown the ability to hypnotize or influence large groups of people. He initially possessed a man to establish a cult called LOL to make himself into a god, but was defeated by Mob and lost most of his spiritual capabilities. Left as little more than a wisp of a spirit, he was able to convince Mob to spare him and was deemed reasonably harmless. Though Dimple found he could not exploit Mob, he remained by his side before his essence was further reduced by Teruki. Dimple then played a role in fully awakening Ritsu's psychic powers, serving as a conduct for Ritsu to channel his powers until he could do it himself.

Played by: Ayumu Mochizuki
Mob's younger brother, a seventh grade student with good looks who is an ace student and member of the Student Council. Ritsu has had an inferiority complex towards Mob's powers, though he is able to hide his obsessive longing for psychic power of his own. He eventually developed his own psychic powers and became a fairly powerful Esper, learning it to be tied to his feelings of grief and guilt while using Dimple to hone his abilities. In the final arc of the manga, it turns out he has his own 100% powers.

Played by: Atsushi Arai
Black Vinegar Middle School's "ura banchou" ("hidden boss"), known to most as Teru. Also a powerful Esper, he originally held scorn for people without psychic power, calling them "commoners." He is accustomed to using his power freely in daily life, be it exams or sports, and he excels at it all. Coupled with his handsome looks, he is very popular. After he is lectured and defeated by Mob for his arrogance and for using his powers against others, his perspective on psychic power changes, and he becomes friendlier to those around him. Teru later becomes the mentor for the psychic children that were captured by Claw.

 The son of Claw's leader Touichirou Suzuki, assumed to be a member of the organization before revealing himself as opposing his father. He has been scouting for potential psychics captured by Claw to help him. Shou is an extremely powerful psychic, capable of easily smashing Ishiguro's gravity orbs with little effort. Shou states that he can always find a way to deal with the psychic powers of his opponents. One of Shou's most notable techniques allows him to refract light around him, rendering him invisible to the naked eye.

Played by: Kasumi Yamaya
Despite her clubmates preferring to be lazy, Tome is passionate about telepathy with aspirations of making contact with aliens. She becomes one of Mob's good friends.

Claw
 is a criminal organization composed of many Espers, gathering others with psychic powers for their scheme to achieve world domination.

The leader of Claw, Touichiro is a ruthless and cunning man who founded Claw for the sole purpose of world domination and uses everyone he can to achieve this goal. Being an incredibly powerful psychic on par with Mob, he aims to put the rest of humanity under his thumb. He also seeks to find his ex-wife who left him many years ago.

Ultimate 5 

An extremely powerful Esper, Serizawa is one of the major members of Claw who suffers from anxiety. He originally was a man who stayed in his room all day and never went out because his psychic powers would be uncontrollable. When Touichiro went to his room, he gives Serizawa an umbrella which became his main weapon and then gets appointed as one of the Ultimate 5 members. After the Claw World Domination arc, he joins the Spirits and Such Consultations.

A member of the Ultimate 5 who has his eyes closed most of the time. Shimazaki's abilities include teleportation and predicting people's movements. His trump card is Mind's Eye, which is when his eyes open with a red iris and a black sclera, which gives him a boost in power. He defended Claw's main base during Claw's world domination, and fought Ritsu, Teru and some of the 7th Division Scars, until retreating since Mob came and found out his powers were too strong, after Reigen attacked him.

A powerful esper of the Ulimate 5, whose specialty is using plants. He assisted in Claw's world domination, and fought Mob and Matsuo until he was defeated by Mogami. After the Claw World Domination arc, he became a florist.

An incredibly buff man of the Ultimate 5, who uses psychic powers to increase the strength of his muscles. He is one of the only espers known to be invulnerable to Sakurai's cursed spray, which instead makes him even more powerful. He fought Dimple in Mob's body and the Body Improvement Club, but then defeated by Mob himself.

A man with glasses in the Ultimate 5, who uses his psychic powers to manipulate technology and also uses telekinesis. He participated in Claw's world domination, until Shou defeats him easily.

7th Division 
The 7th Divisions are run by Scars, who have a scar on their body, as the name suggests. Scars are said to be more powerful espers of the organization, and according to Shimazaki, Scars are failures that are marked as damaged goods. The 7th Division has 11 Scars.

A Scar who is the leader of Claw's 7th Division. He is a diminutive old man who hides his heavily scarred face in a black bodysuit with a gas mask, the mask having a built-in voice changer that made others assume he was a girl. A firm believer that his psychic power to manipulate gravity makes him superior, Ishiguro's arrogance makes him prone to childish temperament to the point of being murderous. After losing to Reigen with his remaining followers renouncing Claw, Ishiguro ends up being dispatched by Shou when he attempts to kill everyone.

A Scar who wears glasses. He has a scar on his left cheek. His fighting abilities are using his sword Jugan, his gun Jugan Air Gun, and his cologne which causes extreme drowsiness. All of his weapons are enhanced with curses Sakurai placed on them repeatedly, making them powerful. He reveals his backstory to Reigen while fighting him, saying that he was abandoned by his parents as a kid and was bullied in his orphanage, and wished to escape from society, making him join Claw, He fights for Claw, until getting defeated by Reigen, he then turns over a new leaf. He fights against Claw when they plot world domination.

A hot-headed Scar who has a diagonal scar through his face. He has a mohawk and is very buff. His fighting abilities consist of his arm shaped as a helix, called Telekinetic Helix, and his trump card is using a move called Energy Bomb. He had a mission to retrieve Mob, and finds Ritsu who is mistakenly believed to be Mob. Before trying to kidnap Ritsu, Mob fights Koyama, beats him up, but Mob ends up using 100% and he runs away because he is too powerful. Koyama then faces Mob again, but then gets defeated immediately. He sided with Claw, but then he fights against Claw after the 7th Division got dissolved. He helped in the fight against Claw when they attempt world domination.

Matsuo is a Scar of the 7th Division. He has a scar through his right eye. He is able to capture evil spirits and use them under his command. He fought for the 7th Division, until he got defeated. He then shows again on the good side, as he helps Reigen, Mob and Dimple fight Mogami without being noticed, until Mogami is captured by him.

A bald Scar with his head having a scar. His ability is Ethereal Body Technique, which allow him to clone his body. He fought for the 7th Division, until Reigen convinces him to resolve and leave Claw. He then helped fight against Claw from world domination.

An energetic Scar who has a scar on the right side of his forehead. His specialty is pyrokinesis. He fought Teruki, until getting killed by him.

A Scar with a scar on his forehead. Takeuchi can use special qi abilities. His faces changes when he gets serious. He fought for the 7th Division, but then left Claw after the division dissolved, and fought against Claw from world domination.

A Scar with a scar under her right eye. Tsuchiya has strong muscles and uses her powers to increase the strength of her arms. She fought for the 7th Division, but then left Claw after the division dissolved, and fought against Claw from world domination.

A Scar and a small child with a scar on her left cheek. Mukai specialises in using her "dolls" telepathically to fight enemies. She fought for the 7th Division, but then left Claw after the division dissolved, and fought against Claw from world domination.

A Scar with a long, horizontal scar on his nose. Terada's ability is using his telekinetic powers to make whips from his hands simple called Air Whips. They have a range of sixty meters. He fought for the 7th Division, but then left Claw after the division dissolved, and fought against Claw from world domination.

A Scar with an unusually long chin and has a scar on it. His ability is to give people mental pictures of their worst fears and traumatizing them. He fought for the 7th Division, and tried to kill Mob with his powers, but then died from Mob using his powers at 100% and attacked him.

Supporting characters

A delinquent at Salt Middle School with a short temper. He is prone to violence, yet held a perfect class attendance record for two consecutive years. He is not above using others to obtain what he wants, having attempted to use the Body Improvement Club to fight Teruki Hanazawa for him. After Mob's destruction of Black Vinegar Middle school, Onigawara inadvertently started the "White T-Poison" rumor. He later becomes a member of the Body Improvement Club after Shinji Kamuro frames him and turns his class against him, and he decides to better himself as a person.

A member of Salt Middle School's Journalism Club who met Mob while investigating the LOL cult. She developed an interest in his psychic abilities and helped found the Psycho Helmet Cult.

Played by: Yūki Yoda
Tsubomi is Mob's childhood friend and his crush. She values hard work and effort over natural talent and is one of few who truly don't care about Mob's psychic ability. Because of her indifference towards his powers, she influenced Mob's decision to not depend on his powers, as well as the decision to join the Body Improvement Club.

Raised on a farm, Musashi is kind-hearted with a strong sense of justice who only resorts to fighting when left with no choice.

A former psychic who was once dubbed "The Greatest Psychic of the 20th Century", he began working as an assassin to help his ill mother. When she came back as an evil spirit and blamed her death on her son, Mogami committed suicide and became a spirit. One day, he possesses a kid named Asagiri Minori, and Mob, Reigen and Dimple come to stop him. Mob enters Minori's mental world and Mogami makes him lose his sense of self, slowly killing him, until Dimple comes to the mental world and regains Mob's self. Mob fights Mogami, and defeats him, resulting Mogami to change his ways and decides to watch over Mob, until Matsuo captures him. He shows up again in Claw's world domination and defeats Minegishi.

Mitsuura Group 
The Mitsuura Group are a group of espers used for research to make everyone in society have psychic powers. The espers have very basic abilities, but eventually they get trained by Teruki and became more powerful. The group disbanded by Kenji after Claw's world domination arc, when Rei, Daichi and Kaito tell Kenji they didn't want to participate anymore, as they were worried that it might cause people to misuse their powers, but the group still meets each other as friends.

Played by: Yuki Kubota
The leader of the Mitsuura Group who doesn't have psychic powers and wished to make artificial psychic powers for all of society to use, he then disbands the group after he was convinced by Rei, Daichi and Kaito that people might misuse their abilities when the project succeeds.

A member who is able to use telekinesis. He doesn't like it when called weak. His abilities were only strong enough to simply bend spoons with full efforts, until being under Teruki's training, Takeshi's telekinesis became stronger.

Played by: Akane Sakanoue
A member who is able to use clairvoyance. She had a crush on Ritsu and Teru. Her efficiency was 67%, but after being under Teruki's training, her accuracy improved.

A member who is able to use pyrokinesis. He at first could barely make a small flame, but then gets much stronger under Teruki's training.

Played by: Akihisa Shiono
A member who is able to use telepathy and is Kaito's brother. He first could only communicate with his brother, but then became able to use telepathy on anyone after Teruki trained him.

Played by: Kohei Fukuyama
A member who is able to use telepathy and is Daichi's brother. He first could only communicate with his brother, but then became able to use telepathy on anyone after Teruki trained him.

References

External links
  

Mob Psycho 100